Georg Ruby (born 16 December 1953) is a German jazz pianist, composer, and arranger. He is also the founder of the record label .

Ruby has recorded several albums with Michel Pilz. The New York City Jazz Record ranked their Deuxième Bureau "The Album of the Year 2011".

Discography 
This is not a comprehensive list.

 Potosi/Dioko (1985)
 Strange Loops (1993)
 Village Zone, Mackeben Revisit (2006)
 Ruby Domesticus Vulgaris (2006)
 Personal Songbook (2008)
 Deconstruction Service (2009)
 Village Zone (2019)

References 

1953 births
Living people
German jazz pianists